Live from the Styleetron is the debut studio album by Oakland-based hip hop group Raw Fusion. The group was fronted by Ron Brooks, known as Money-B, an active member of Digital Underground who produced this album as a side project with fellow group member David Elliot known as DJ FUZE. Among many featured artists was a young unknown performer named Tupac Shakur who would later become a legendary figure in the world of hip hop.

Critical Reception
The Raw Fusion album was compared to the jazz-influenced hip hop groups like A Tribe Called Quest and De La Soul.

One of the few serious tracks on this album is "Wild Francis," a political statement made through the tale of a woman who is killed by police after becoming a Marxist revolutionary figure.

The album features eight members of Digital Underground, as well as guests Another Ninja, Cooley Ranks, Daddy Courtney, Jessica Jones, Mac-Mone, Margie Marie Rubio, Ronville, Sean, Styleetron, and Pam Taylor. The album peaked at number 32 on the Billboard Heatseekers charts.

Humpty Hump and Digital Underground
Gregory Jacobs, known by his stage name Humpty Hump among others, was the lead vocalist for Digital Underground. This particular stage persona of Jacobs was the fuel behind "The Humpty Dance" that peaked at number 11 on the Billboard charts in 1990 and first brought widespread fame to the group. Money-B, new to Digital Underground, provided vocals in The Humpty Dance and three other tracks on the album Sex Packets and co-wrote "Freaks of the Industry" with Jacobs while DJ FUZE participated in two tracks. Jacobs, in turn, appeared in "Funkintoyoear" on Raw Fusion's album appearing as both Shock G and Humpty Hump.

2Pac
Tupac Shakur, a roadie and backup dancer for Digital Underground, appeared as a guest artist on the album. Shakur's debut as an emcee had come only nine months prior to this Raw Fusion release, the 19-year-old appearing in the Digital Underground track "Same Song" with Dan Aykroyd released on the motion picture soundtrack Nothing but Trouble in February 1991. In October 1991, one month prior to Raw Fusion's debut, Shakur again appeared with Digital Underground featured in a single track on the album Sons of the P.

The track "#1 with a Bullet" on Live from the Styleetron was only Shakur's third appearance as a rapper. Raw Fusion frontman Money-B stated in an interview that Shakur, at that time, was not a great rapper but was always able to grab the attention of everyone in the room, noting his tremendous work ethic, passion, and drive. Shakur released his first solo album 2Pacalypse Now with Interscope Records on November 12, 1991, the same Tuesday that Live from the Styleetron was released.

Steve Counter served as sound engineer on both 2Pacalypse Now and Live from the Styleetron as well as nine En Vogue albums during his career. Another credited sound engineer Darrin Harris worked with many acts including Ghostface Killah, Tony! Toni! Toné!, and the Bee Gees. Perhaps the most notable sound engineer was Matt Kelly who has worked with the likes of Johnny Cash, Joe Satriani, and Little Jimmy Dickens throughout a career that began in 1958.

Track listing

Billboard Charts

Credits
Cover Illustration: Scott Anderson
Cover Art Concept: Money-B, DJ FUZE
Photography: Victor Hall
Engineer, Mixing: Steve Counter, Darrin Harris, Matt Kelly, Money-B
Mastering: Ken Lee
Stylistic Advisor: Money-B
Beat Box, Mixing, Scratching, Technician; DJ FUZE
Bass, Guitar: Ramone "Pee Wee" Gooden
Guitar: Sunny-B
Saxophone: Jessica Jones
Piano: The Piano-Man

References

External links 
"Throw Your Hands in the Air" video on YouTube
"Rockin' to the P.M." video on YouTube

1991 debut albums